Cameron John Gannon (born 23 January 1989) is an Australian-American cricketer. He was a member of the 2011–2012 Queensland Bulls squad.

Born in Baulkham Hills, New South Wales, Gannon is one of the Ipswich Grammar School Old Boys. He began playing cricket as a junior with Ipswich Brothers and Ipswich Grammar School. Aged 19 he played for a season in Reading, England, for the Sonning Club.

Gannon made his first-class debut in a Sheffield Shield match against Tasmania in October 2010. Gannon signed with Brisbane Heat in 2012 made his Twenty20 debut in 2012 in the KFC Big Bash League.

In August 2019, he was named in the United States' squad for the Regional Finals of the 2018–19 ICC T20 World Cup Americas Qualifier tournament. He made his Twenty20 International (T20I) debut for the United States against Bermuda on 18 August 2019. He is qualified through his mother, who is American.

In June 2020, Gannon joined Western Australia on a three-year deal. In January 2021, USA Cricket named Gannon in a 44-man squad to begin training in Texas ahead of the 2021 Oman Tri-Nation Series.

References

External links 
 

1989 births
Living people
American cricketers
Australian cricketers
Cricketers from Sydney
Queensland cricketers
Brisbane Heat cricketers
Melbourne Renegades cricketers
Melbourne Stars cricketers
United States Twenty20 International cricketers
Western Australia cricketers
Australian emigrants to the United States
American people of Australian descent